"Just When You're Thinkin' Things Over" was a 1995 single by the English indie band The Charlatans, released from their self-titled fourth album.  It charted at #12 on the UK Singles Chart.

Parts of the chorus and verse are musically identical to John Lennon song "Bring on the Lucie (Freda People)" from the 1973 album "Mind Games"

Track listing
CD
 "Just When You're Thinkin' Things Over" - 4:51
 "Chemical Risk" (Toothache Remix) - 3:41 (Remixed by The Chemical Brothers)
 "Frinck" - 4:38 	
 "Your Skies Are Mine" - 3:56

 12"
 "Just When You're Thinkin' Things Over"
 "Frinck"
 "Chemical Risk Dub" (Toothache Remix) (Remixed by The Chemical Brothers)
 "Nine Acre Dust" (Remixed by The Chemical Brothers)

References

1995 singles
The Charlatans (English band) songs
1995 songs
Beggars Banquet Records singles